Leonard Frank Reynolds (3 March 1897 – 21 August 1939) was an Australian painter, illustrator, caricaturist, and cartoonist. He was the child of Frank Augustus Reynolds and Eleanor Theresa (née Jones) Reynolds.

Reynolds attended Hobart Technical College (now known as TasTAFE) in 1909–12, 1914, and 1918, and he exhibited with the Art Society of Tasmania from 1918–19. He has been variously credited as Len Reynolds, Leonard Reynolds, Leonard F. Reynolds, and L. F. Reynolds. He is well known for his caricatures, including illustrations of Australian General Sir Thomas Blamey; Australian rules footballers Syd and Gordon Coventry; journalist, publicist and playwright Campbell Dixon; and various politicians, including Herbert Pratten.  

He died at the age of 42 in Beaumaris, Victoria, Australia, when his car went off a cliff. Due to Reynolds' early death, all of his works are public domain.

References 

1897 births
1939 deaths
Australian caricaturists
Australian painters
Australian cartoonists
Australian male artists
Road incident deaths in Victoria (Australia)